The 1996 season was the Kansas City Chiefs' 27th in the National Football League (NFL) and their 37th overall. Following their loss to the Colts in the playoffs the year before, the Chiefs failed to improve their 13–3 record from 1995 and finishing 9–7 record and second-place finish in the AFC West. Despite being predicted as one of the eventual winners of Super Bowl XXXI by Sports Illustrated, the team missed the playoffs for the first time since 1989.

Offseason

NFL draft

Personnel

Staff

Roster

Schedule

Preseason

Regular season

Note: Intra-division opponents are in bold text.

Game summaries

Week 1: at Houston Oilers

Week 2: vs. Oakland Raiders

Week 3: at Seattle Seahawks

Week 4: vs. Denver Broncos

Week 5: at San Diego Chargers

Week 6: vs. Pittsburgh Steelers

Week 8: vs. Seattle Seahawks

Week 9: at Denver Broncos

Week 10: at Minnesota Vikings

Week 11: vs. Green Bay Packers

Week 12: vs. Chicago Bears

Week 13: vs. San Diego Chargers

Week 14: at Detroit Lions
NFL on Thanksgiving Day

Week 15: at Oakland Raiders

Week 16: vs. Indianapolis Colts

Week 17: at Buffalo Bills

Standings

References

Kansas City Chiefs
Kansas City Chiefs seasons
Kansas